Morten Harry Olsen (born in 1960 in Narvik) is a Norwegian author. Olsen made his literary debut in 1985 with the short story collection For alt hva vi er verdt, which won Tarjei Vesaas' debutantpris. Many of his books have been hits with critics.

Olsen studied criminology at the University of Oslo and philosophy at the University of Tromsø. He has worked as a travel agent, taxi driver, night porter, journalist, translator, office worker, literary critic, education consultant, and teacher. He was head of Norsk Forfattersentrum (1989–91), head of arrangements for the Brage Prize (1991–95) and deputy head of the Norwegian Authors' Union (1997–98). From 1988 to 1991 he was a member of the Norwegian Authors' Union's Literary Caucus. From 1992-1996 he was editor of Bokklubben krim og spenning.

Bibliography 
For alt hva vi er verdt – short stories (1985)
Ganske enkelt sand – novel (1986)
En dans til – short stories (1988)
Tråder – essays (1989)
Mississippi – novel (1990)
Syndenes forlatelse – crime novel (1991)
Mannen som hatet duer – play (1992)
Begjærets pris – crime novel (1993)
Tilfeldig utvalg – crime novel (1996)
Naken for leseren, naken for Gud: et essay om romanen – literary criticism (1997)
Mord og galskap – novel (2000)
Mississippi. neo – novel (2002)
Størst av alt – novel (2004)
"Adrian Marconis Great Sorrow" (2010

"Skrivehåndverket - A practical Guide for Beginners" (2014)

Prizes 
Tarjei Vesaas' debutantpris 1985, for For alt hva vi er verdt
Riverton Prize 1993, for Begjærets pris
Havmannprisen 2004, for Størst av alt

References

External links

Morten Harry Olsen's homepage
Kreativ Prosa v/Morten Harry Olsen
 Morten Harry Olsen at NRK Forfatter
 Morten Harry Olsen at Dagbladet Forfatter
 Morten Harry Olsen at Aftenposten Alex

20th-century Norwegian novelists
21st-century Norwegian novelists
Norwegian crime fiction writers
Norwegian essayists
People from Narvik
1960 births
Living people
20th-century essayists
21st-century essayists
Travel agents (people)